The behavior of a given DEVS model is a set of sequences of timed events including null events, called event segments, which make the model move from one state to another within a set of legal states. To define it this way, the concept of a set of illegal state as well a set of legal states needs to be introduced.

In addition, since the behavior of a given DEVS model needs to define how the state transition change both when time is passed by and when an event occurs, it has been described by a much general formalism, called general system [ZPK00]. In this article, we use a sub-class of General System formalism, called timed event system instead.

Depending on how the total state and the external state transition function of a DEVS model are defined, there are two ways to define the behavior of a DEVS model using Timed Event System.
Since the behavior of a coupled DEVS model is defined as an atomic DEVS model, the behavior of coupled DEVS class is also defined by timed event system.

View 1: total states = states * elapsed times 
Suppose that a DEVS model,
 has

 the external state transition .
 the total state set  where  denotes elapsed time since last event and  denotes the set of non-negative real numbers, and

Then the DEVS model,
 is a Timed Event System  where
 The event set .
 The state set  where .
 The set of initial states .
 The set of accepting states 
For a non-accepting state , there is no change together with any even segment  so 

For a total state  at time  and an event segment  as follows. 

If unit event segment  is the null event segment, i.e. 
  

If unit event segment  is a timed event  where the event is an input event ,
  

If unit event segment  is a timed event  where the event is an output event or the unobservable event ,
  

Computer algorithms to simulate this view of behavior are available at Simulation Algorithms for Atomic DEVS.

View 2: total states = states * lifespans * elapsed times 
Suppose that a DEVS model,
 has

 the total state set  where  denotes lifespan of state ,  denotes elapsed time since last update, and  denotes the set of non-negative real numbers plus infinity,

Then the DEVS  is a timed event system  where
 The event set .
 The state set  where .
 The set of initial states.
 The set of acceptance states .
For a non-accepting state , there is no changes together with any segment  so 

For a total state  at time  and an event segment  as follows. 

If unit event segment  is the null event segment, i.e. 
  

If unit event segment  is a timed event  where the event is an input event ,
  

If unit event segment  is a timed event  where the event is an output event or the unobservable event ,
  
Computer algorithms to simulate this view of behavior are available at Simulation Algorithms for Atomic DEVS.

Comparison of View1 and View2

Features of View1 
View1 has been introduced by Zeigler [Zeigler84] in which given a total state  and  
where  is the remaining time [Zeigler84] [ZPK00]. In other words, the set of partial states is indeed  where  is a state set.

When a DEVS model receives an input event , View1 resets the elapsed time  by zero, if the DEVS model needs to ignore  in terms of the lifespan control, modellers have to update the remaining time
  
in the external state transition function  that is the responsibility of the modellers.

As a result, the number of states  is also unlimited that is the reason why View2 has been proposed.

If we don't care the finite-vertex reachability graph of a DEVS model, View1 has an advantage of simplicity for treating the elapsed time  every time any input event arrives into the DEVS model.

Features of View2 
View2 has been introduced by Hwang and Zeigler[HZ06][HZ07] in which given a total state , the remaining time,  is computed as

  

When a DEVS model receives an input event , View2 resets the elapsed time  by zero only if . If the DEVS model needs to ignore  in terms of the lifespan control, modellers can use .
  
As a result, we can abstract behavior of such a DEVS-class network, for example SP-DEVS and FD-DEVS, as a finite-vertex graph, called reachability graph [HZ06][HZ07].

See also 
 DEVS
 Behavior of Coupled DEVS
 Simulation Algorithms for Atomic DEVS
 Simulation Algorithms for Coupled DEVS

References 
 [Zeigler76] 
 [Zeigler84] 
 [ZKP00] 
 [HZ06] M. H. Hwang and Bernard Zeigler, ``A Reachable Graph of Finite and Deterministic DEVS Networks``, Proceedings of 2006 DEVS Symposium, pp48-56, Huntsville, Alabama, USA, (Available at https://web.archive.org/web/20120726134045/http://www.acims.arizona.edu/ and http://moonho.hwang.googlepages.com/publications)
 [HZ07] M.H. Hwang and Bernard Zeigler, ``Reachability Graph of Finite & Deterministic DEVS``, IEEE Transactions on Automation Science and Engineering, Volume 6, Issue 3, 2009, pp. 454–467, http://ieeexplore.ieee.org/xpl/freeabs_all.jsp?isnumber=5153598&arnumber=5071137&count=19&index=7

Automata (computation)
Formal specification languages